The Chapel of St. Mary, was a chapel dedicated to Saint Mary at Upper Kilchattan located on the Inner Hebridean island of Colonsay, Scotland.

According to tradition it was built by the monks of Iona. The chapel is now in ruins.

Citations

Archaeological sites in the Southern Inner Hebrides
Colonsay
Churches in Argyll and Bute
Former churches in Scotland